Mia Gross (born 18 April 2001) is an Australian track and field athlete who competes in sprint events. She was junior Australian champion in the 100m and 200m in both 2018 and 2019. As a senior, Gross was part of the Australian sprint relay team that finished fourth at the 2022 Commonwealth Games.

Career
As a junior, Gross was entered into the 2017 Commonwealth Youth Games held in Nassau, Bahamas. At the Games however, Gross had her wrist broken following an incident in which another competitor knocked her over by jogging into her lane when she was training. Gross competed in the 100m despite the freshly broken wrist, and against medical advice, but missed out on a place in the final by 0.02 seconds.

Gross reached the semi finals at the 2018 IAAF World U20 Championships in Tampere, Finland in the 200m, and was part of an Australian relay team which reached the final of the 4x100m relay and finished in a national and Oceanian under-20 record time of 44.78 seconds. In 2018, and 2019, Gross won National U20 100m and 200m titles.

Competing at the senior level, Gross was selected to be a member of the Australian team for the 2022 Commonwealth Games as part of the 4x100m relay team that finished qualified through to the final and ultimately finished fourth.

Personal life
Gross attended Geelong Grammar School. Gross is the cousin of triathlete Jo King. Gross also works as a personal trainer at a gym in Melbourne.

References

External links
 

Living people
2001 births
Sportspeople from Geelong
Athletes from Melbourne
Australian female sprinters
Commonwealth Games competitors for Australia
21st-century Australian women